William J. Bryan (6 September 1912 – 2 August 1944) was an English professional footballer who played as a goalkeeper in the Football League for Walsall, Southend United, Swindon Town, and Wrexham.

Personal life
Bryan served as a private in the Dorsetshire Regiment during the Second World War and was killed while serving with the 5th Battalion, Dorsetshire Regiment, part pf the 43rd (Wessex) Infantry Division, during the Battle of Normandy on 2 August 1944. He is buried at Tilly-sur-Seulles War Cemetery.

Career statistics

References

1912 births
1944 deaths
Military personnel from Yorkshire
Footballers from Doncaster
Association football goalkeepers
English footballers
English Football League players
Owston Park Rangers F.C. players
Sunderland A.F.C. players
Walsall F.C. players
Southend United F.C. players
Swindon Town F.C. players
Wrexham A.F.C. players
Dorset Regiment soldiers
British Army personnel killed in World War II
Burials at Tilly-sur-Seulles War Cemetery